Waldstetten is a municipality in the district of Günzburg in Bavaria in Germany.

References 

Populated places in Günzburg (district)